In rail transport, a wayside horn is an audible signal used at level crossings. They can be used in place of, or in addition to, the locomotive's horn as the train approaches the crossing. They are often used in special railroad "quiet zones" in the United States, where the engineer is not required to sound the locomotive's horn at a crossing. This reduces the ambient noise at the crossing, which may be desirable in residential areas. Such railroad crossings may still require the traditional bells as part of the crossing signals in addition to the wayside horns.

One form is mounted on a pole at the crossing. The product is patented.

See also
 Whistle post

References

Further reading
 For regulation in the United States: 49 CFR 222.59

Level crossings